The 1996 All-Ireland Minor Football Championship was the 65th staging of the All-Ireland Minor Football Championship, the Gaelic Athletic Association's premier inter-county Gaelic football tournament for boys under the age of 18.

Westmeath entered the championship as defending champions, however, they were defeated in the Leinster Championship.

On 15 September 1996, Laois won the championship following a 2-11 to 1-11 defeat of Kerry in the All-Ireland final. This was their first All-Ireland title. It is the first of three titles they have won at this grade.

Results

Connacht Minor Football Championship

Quarter-Final

Semi-Finals

Final

Leinster Minor Football Championship

Preliminary Round

Quarter-Finals

Semi-Finals

Final

Munster Minor Football Championship

Quarter-Finals

Semi-Finals

Final

Ulster Minor Football Championship

Preliminary Round

Quarter-Finals

Semi-Finals

Final

All-Ireland Minor Football Championship

Semi-Finals

Final

Championship statistics

Miscellaneous

 Laois win the Leinster Championship for the first time since 1967.

References

1996
All-Ireland Minor Football Championship